Karma is Tarkan's fourth studio album, released in 2001. His fifth music project and his fourth original release, this album moved away from pop to worldbeat melodies fused with electronica sounds and became the all time third best selling album in Turkey. The album was recorded in Istanbul, Los Angeles, New York City, Egypt and Europe. Album was published in Europe, North America, Asia, Japan, Russia. By 2001 more than 3.6 million copies of this album was sold worldwide. The tour "Kuzu Kuzu" which began in January 2002 was very successful as well and Tarkan performed in 19 countries and gave 26 concerts.

As an introduction in the CD booklet, Tarkan explains the Karma philosophy and introduces the concept of using Ebru art on his album cover.

Track listing 

Hüp (Remix)

Album credits
Personnel Crew:
 Engineering: Ken Deranteriasian, Serkan Kula, Frederic Blanc Garin, Frank Redlich, Matthew Murat Erdem
 Mixing: Brad Gilderman, Devrim Karaoglu, Kivanch K, Murat Matthew Erdem, Ozan Çolakoğlu, Ulaş Agce
 Assistant Mixers: Chandler Bridges, Deshaun Washington, Michael Huff, Myriam Correge, Keith Armstrong
 Mastering: Murat Matthew Erdem, Ulas Agce
 CD Publishing: Odeon A.S
 Concept & Photography: Sevil Sert
 Marbleization Artist: Hikmet Barutçugil
 Graphic Design & Planning: Stars Reklam Hizmetleri A.S
 Publishing: Onur Ofset
 Public Relations: HITT Production

Guest musicians
Background vocals:
 Berna Keser
 Cihan Okan
 Deniz Seki
 Murat Matthew Erdem
 Özkan Ugur
 Özlem Tekin
Instruments:
 Guitar (Acoustic), Guitar (Electric) - Bilgehan Tuncer
 Guitar - Annas, Erdem Sökmen, Erdinç Senyaylar
 12 String Guitar, Laúd - Jean Louis Solon
 Baglama - Ahmet Koç, Çetin Akdeniz
 Bass - Avo Harutunian, Ismail Soyberk, Janik Top
 Oud - Yildiran Güz
 Solo Violin - Lawrence Monti
 String Composition & Orchestration - Ozan Çolakoğlu
 Strings - Armen Aharioan Los Angeles Strings, Hossam Ramzy Strings Group, Orchestra Opéra de Marseille (Conductor: Rene Perinelli)
 Sitar, Didjeridoo, Sarode - Jeffrey Slatnick
 Ney - Muhammed Fouda
 English Horn - Jean Claude Latic
 Clarinet - Kirpi Bülent
 Accordion - Mohsen Allaam
 Percussion - Cengiz Ercümer, Hossam Ramzy, Marc Chontereau, Luis Conte, Seyfi Ayta

Music videos
 "Kuzu Kuzu" (Two videos were filmed for this song, including one for an acoustic version released in the single of the same name.)
 "Hüp" (Two videos were filmed for this song, including one for a remixed version released in the single Hüp 8. The video filmed for the original edit was directed by Italian director Ferzan Özpetek. Under the sponsorship of Pepsi it was the most expensive Turkish music video ever produced, which also caused scandal with Tarkan using his tongue to kiss his on-screen lady.)
 "Verme" (Two different versions were filmed for this song. The second version focuses on the effect of war on children, and was the first Turkish music video to use metamorphic special effects.)

External links
 Tarkan Translations
 Album and Song Lyrics Information in English

Tarkan (singer) albums
2001 albums
Albums produced by Ozan Çolakoğlu